Buzz! Junior: Ace Racers is the fifth and latest game in the Buzz! Junior series of party games. It was developed by Cohort Studios and released in 2008 for the PlayStation 2.

Reception
GamesRadar scored the game as 3/5 and was happy with the variety of game types but criticised the racing mini-games and the "stuck record" announcer. Videogamer.com score the game as 8/10 and praised the mixture of games, the colourful graphics and the ease of play, but was undecided on whether it was a better than previous Buzz! Junior titles.

References

External links

2008 video games
PlayStation 2 games
PlayStation 2-only games
Party video games
Buzz!
Video games developed in the United Kingdom
Europe-exclusive video games
Multiplayer and single-player video games
Cohort Studios games
Sony Interactive Entertainment games